Edward Young Parsons (December 12, 1842 – July 8, 1876) was a U.S. Representative from Kentucky.

Born in Middletown, Kentucky, Parsons attended the public schools at Louisville, Kentucky until age 12. He studied one year in the St. Louis High School. He returned to Louisville and graduated from the municipal university in 1861, where he taught school for three years. He graduated from the Louisville Law School in 1865 and practiced law in Louisville.

Parsons was elected as a Democrat to the 44th United States Congress and served from March 4, 1875, until his death in Washington, D.C., July 8, 1876. He was interred in Cave Hill Cemetery, Louisville.

See also
List of United States Congress members who died in office (1790–1899)

References

1842 births
1876 deaths
Burials at Cave Hill Cemetery
Kentucky lawyers
Politicians from Louisville, Kentucky
University of Louisville alumni
Democratic Party members of the United States House of Representatives from Kentucky
19th-century American politicians
19th-century American lawyers